Tars or TARS may refer to:

Organisations
 The Arthur Ransome Society, based on British children's author Arthur Ransome
 Teen Age Republicans, a youth wing of the US Republican Party
 TARS, an abbreviation for Transporturi Aeriene Româno-Sovietice and the former name of the airline TAROM

Art, entertainment, and media
 TARS, a fictional robot in Christopher Nolan's film Interstellar
 Tars Tarkas, a fictional character in Edgar Rice Burroughs' Barsoom series
 The Tars, a 1934 Dutch comedy film drama

Science and technology
 TARS (gene), gene which encodes a human enzyme
 Tethered Aerostat Radar System, an American low-level airborne ground surveillance system

Other uses
 Tårs, a village in Denmark
 Tars, the sports teams and mascot of Rollins College, Winter Park, Florida, US
 Third Avenue Railway System, a former streetcar system in New York City

See also
 Tar (disambiguation)